Eugène Train (1832–1903) was a French architect who taught for many years at the École des Arts Décoratifs.
He is known as an advocate of rationalist architecture, which he applied with large schools such as the Lycée Chaptal and Lycée Voltaire.

Early years

Eugène Train was born in 1832 in Toul, Meurthe-et-Moselle.
He was admitted to the École des Arts Décoratifs in 1850, and studied under Adolphe-Marie-François Jaÿ.
In 1852 he moved to the École des Beaux-Arts, where he studied under Charles-Auguste Questel.
Eugène Train received the second Prix de Rome in 1859.
He became one of the leaders of the rationalist school of French architecture, particularly with his educational buildings.

Teacher

Train became a tutor at the École des Arts Décoratifs in 1855, and taught there until 1899.
He was a director of the school between 1870 and 1899.
Train was a demanding teacher.
He constantly complained about the lack of education of his pupils, who were required only to be able to read and write. In 1874 he proposed that, at least for the architecture course, there should be an entrance examination in geometry. This was resisted by Laurent-Jan, who did not want any obstacles to admission to his school.
Train also asked in 1874 whether the school could teach students the basic principles of fabrication and coloration so they could design carpets, wall hangings and stained-glass windows.
This represented a new departure for the school, which had avoided specialized training until then.

Architect

Train became an architect of the city of Paris in 1863.
Between 1863 and 1876 he designed and oversaw construction of the new Lycée Chaptal.
The original premises of the school were irregular in plan and too cramped for the student body.
Train was selected to build the new school following specifications defined by the city.
Construction started in 1866, but was interrupted by the Franco-Prussian War of 1870. Work resumed in 1871 and was completed in 1876.
Train was architect of the Lycée Voltaire on the Avenue de la République. Construction began in 1885.
The school accommodated 1,200 pupils, of whom 500 were boarders.
The decorations of the building included metal and ceramics.

Eugène Train was made a knight of the Legion of Honour.
He died in  Annecy in 1903 at the age of 71.

Students

Eugène Millet (1819–1879)
Charles-Louis Genuys (1852–1928)
Gustave Rives (1858–1926).
Joseph Hornecker (1873–1942)

Notes

Sources

1832 births
1903 deaths
People from Toul
19th-century French architects
Prix de Rome for architecture
École des Beaux-Arts alumni